Mount Bergen is a prominent rocky peak, 2,110 m, standing 2 nautical miles (3.7 km) west of Mount Gran on the north side of Mackay Glacier in Victoria Land. Surveyed in 1957 by the New Zealand Northern Survey Party of the Commonwealth Trans-Antarctic Expedition (1956–58) and named by them after the birthplace in Norway of Tryggve Gran, a member of the British Antarctic Expedition, 1910–13.

Mountains of Victoria Land
Scott Coast